On June 30, 2017, at around 2:45 PM EDT, a doctor opened fire at the Bronx-Lebanon Hospital Center in the Bronx, New York City, United States, killing a doctor on the 17th floor and wounding six people on the 16th floor with an AR-15-type semi-automatic rifle. The shooter was later identified as 45-year-old Nigerian-born Dr. Henry Michael Bello, a family physician formerly employed by the hospital.

Background 
Dr. David Lazala, a graduate of the family medical residency program and current faculty member, told the Associated Press that he was one of the physicians training Bello, who sent Lazala a threatening email after being fired. He took Friday off and was reportedly the target of the attack. Dr. Maureen Kwankam said she fired Bello after two years of employment. Kwankam further stated "We fired him because he was kind of crazy. He promised to come back and kill us then."

Hours before the shooting, Bello sent an e-mail to the New York Daily News, making various accusations in regards to his firing, stating "First, I was told it was because I always kept to myself. Then it was because of an altercation with a nurse. Then I was told, it was because I threatened a colleague." Bello blamed a specific doctor for blocking his career progress and costing him $400,000.

Incident
Dr. Tracy Tam was shot and killed on the 17th floor of the hospital. Tam was randomly targeted, according to Dr. Sridhar Chilimuri, the hospital chief. Bello intended to kill the doctor who had cost him his job by accusing him of sexual harassment. Tam, who normally worked in the clinic, was asked to cover a shift of a physician who was out. That change proved fatal for her.

Six others (three doctors, two medical students and a patient) were injured. The most seriously wounded was a doctor shot in the knee and brain, who underwent several hours of surgery on-site and was sent to Mt. Sinai Hospital for more. The other two doctors were shot in the neck and abdomen, one student was shot in the hand and the patient had an unspecified minor injury.

The New York City Police Department said Bello committed suicide after barricading himself inside with a rifle and setting himself on fire.

Victims 
Tracy Tam, DO, a family medicine physician and graduate of Touro College of Osteopathic Medicine, was killed. 

Justin Timperio, MD, a first year family medicine resident and a graduate of the American University of the Caribbean, was shot and sustained injuries to the liver, stomach, intestines, and lung. Oluwafunmike Ojewoye, MD, a second year family medicine resident and a graduate of Temple University School of Medicine sustained a neck gun shot wound. A gastroenterology fellow doing a consult sustained a hand gun shot wound. Two medical students from Ross University School of Medicine were shot, one to the head and knee. A patient was also injured and was listed in stable condition while the others were deceased or in critical condition. Timperio was transferred to Mount Sinai Hospital, according to his father, Luciano Timperio, an oral surgeon from St. Catherines, Ontario, Canada; the senior Timperio blamed the lack of medical school positions in Ontario for his son's injuries.

Perpetrator
Bello (born Henry Williams Obotetukudo) had formerly worked for the hospital. He had resigned from the hospital amid a sexual harassment complaint two years prior. He was a graduate of Ross University School of Medicine in Dominica and was formerly a pharmacy technician in California. He worked as a night shift doctor at the hospital while trying to be admitted into the family medical residency program.

Aftermath
Bello killed himself on the 16th floor of the hospital after the attack. In March 2018, Timperio filed a lawsuit against Bronx Lebanon Hospital Center and a gun dealer who sold Bello a modified AR-15.

See also
Workplace violence

References

2017 crimes in New York City
2017 mass shootings in the United States
Mass shootings in New York (state)
2017 murders in the United States
2010s in the Bronx
Attacks in the United States in 2017
Attacks on hospitals
June 2017 crimes in the United States
Murder in New York City
Murder–suicides in New York City
Suicides in New York City
Attacks on buildings and structures in the United States
Crimes in the Bronx
Deaths by firearm in the Bronx
Workplace shootings in the United States
Mass shootings in the United States
Mass shootings in New York City
2017 active shooter incidents in the United States